Yap Pow Thong (born 8 November 1918) is a Malaysian retired sports shooter. He competed in the trap event at the 1964 Summer Olympics. He also won a bronze medal in team trap event at the 1974 Asian Games.

References

External links
 

1918 births
Possibly living people
Malaysian male sport shooters
Olympic shooters of Malaysia
Shooters at the 1964 Summer Olympics
Place of birth missing (living people)
Asian Games medalists in shooting
Shooters at the 1974 Asian Games
Asian Games bronze medalists for Malaysia
Medalists at the 1974 Asian Games